Folketing elections were held in Denmark on 3 April 1939, except in the Faroe Islands where they were held on 19 April. They followed a dissolution of both chambers in order to call a referendum on changing the constitution. The referendum was held on 23 May but failed due to a low voter turnout. The result of the elections was a victory for the Social Democratic Party, which won 64 of the 149 seats. Voter turnout was 79.2% in Denmark proper and 47.8% in the Faroes.

Results

References

Elections in Denmark
Denmark
Folketing
Denmark